Bjarne Andersen (15 January 1909 – 13 August 1982) was a Norwegian actor, stage producer and theatre director.

Personal life 
Andersen was born in Stavanger to Emil Laurentzius Andersen and Ingeborg Bertine Osmondsdatter Udvig. He married librarian Sissel Aanderaa in 1957.

Career 

Andersen worked for Det Norske Teatret from 1944 to 1951. He served as theatre director at Rogaland Teater from 1958 to 1960, and at Den Nationale Scene from 1961 to 1963. He was chairman for the Norwegian Actors' Equity Association from 1967 to 1969.

He made his film debut in Tancred Ibsens To mistenkelige personer (1950). Among his film roles was the one as Stråmannen (Straw Man) in Arne Skouens Emergency Landing (1952). He also portrayed Paul Cox's sidekick, taxi driver Richardson, in the popular radio plays series God aften, mitt navn er Cox (Good Evening, My Name is Cox).

Andersen directed Norway's first feature film in color, Smuglere i smoking (1957). He also wrote the screenplays for Roser til Monica (1956, also director) and Heksenetter (1954).

References

1909 births
1982 deaths
Norwegian theatre directors
Norwegian theatre managers and producers
Norwegian male stage actors
Norwegian male film actors
Norwegian male radio actors
20th-century Norwegian male actors
Actors from Stavanger